Zlé pondělí is a 1960 Czechoslovak film. The film starred Josef Kemr.

References

External links
 

1960 films
Czechoslovak drama films
1960s Czech-language films
Czech drama films
1960s Czech films